Malov Do (Montenegrin Cyrillic: Малов До) is a village in Krivošije in southwestern Montenegro, located near the former settlement and Austro-Hungarian military base of Crkvice. According to the 2011 census, the village had 8 inhabitants. The village church, Church of the Nativity of the Virgin Mary, was built in 1831.

See also
 Crkvice
 Krivošije

References 

Krivošije
Populated places in Kotor Municipality